Kluk may refer to:

Family name 
 Angelika Kluk (1983–2006), Polish college student murdered in Glasgow, Scotland
 Jan Krzysztof Kluk (1739–1796), Polish naturalist agronomist and entomologist

Other 
 Holka nebo kluk (means "A Girl or a Boy"), a Czech comedy play and operetta
 159743 Kluk, a main-belt asteroid
 KLUK (97.9 FM), a radio station broadcasting a classic rock format in Needles, California, USA

See also 
 Kluky (disambiguation)
 Kluki (disambiguation) (Polish form)
 Klug (disambiguation)

Polish-language surnames